FK Varnsdorf is a Czech professional football club located in Varnsdorf, Czech Republic.  In 2011 the club changed its name from SK Slovan Varnsdorf to FK Varnsdorf.

The team's biggest success in recent history was finishing 2nd in the 2014–15 Czech National Football League and earning promotion to the Czech First League for the first time in club history. However, they forfeited the promotion due to their stadium Městský stadion v Kotlině failing to meet league requirements.

Historical names
 1938 SK Hraničáři Varnsdorf
 194? Sokol Elite Varnsdorf
 1953 DSO Jiskra Varnsdorf (after merger with Sokol Velveta Varnsdorf)
 1957 TJ Slovan Varnsdorf (after merger with TJ Spartak Varnsdorf)
 1996 SK Slovan Varnsdorf
 2011 FK Varnsdorf

Players

Current squad
.

Out on loan

Notable former players

References

External links
 

 
Football clubs in the Czech Republic
Association football clubs established in 1938
1938 establishments in Czechoslovakia